Gerard "Geert" Schipper (born 23 November 1948 in Ter Apel) is a road cyclist from the Netherlands. He became world champion in the team time trial at the 1982 UCI Road World Championships together with Maarten Ducrot, Gerrit Solleveld and Frits Van Bindsbergen. He won the Olympia's Tour in 1981 and the Ronde van Noord-Holland in 1985.

References

External links
 profile at Cyclingarchives.com

1948 births
Dutch male cyclists
Living people
People from Westerwolde (municipality)
20th-century Dutch people
21st-century Dutch people
Cyclists from Groningen (province)